Greatest Hits, Volume 2 is a hits compilation album from American singer/songwriter/producer Linda Ronstadt. It was released in late 1980 on Asylum Records.  The record mostly covers Ronstadt's more uptempo singles.  The release has sold close to two million copies in the United States alone and was the superstar's eighth consecutive Platinum-certified album.

This album simply named Linda Ronstadt was releases under license by Supraphon recording company in 1980 in communist Czechoslovakia, where it sold over 350,000 copies.

Track listing

Original release

CD reissue
The CD reissue of the album was compiled with Ronstadt's earlier greatest hits collection and released by Rhino records in 2007 as Greatest Hits, Vol. 1 & 2.

Charts

Certifications

References

1980 greatest hits albums
Linda Ronstadt compilation albums
Asylum Records compilation albums